Chiquimulilla is an extinct Xincan language of Guatemala, from the region of Chiquimulilla.

References

 Campbell, Lyle (1997). American Indian languages: The historical linguistics of Native America. New York: Oxford University Press. .

Xincan languages
Languages extinct in the 1990s
Languages of Guatemala
Extinct languages of North America